Derwen railway station was a station in Derwen, Denbighshire, Wales. The station was opened on 6 October 1864 and closed for passengers in 1953 and completely on 30 April 1962. The station building is now a private residence. The platform also still exists.

References

Further reading

Disused railway stations in Denbighshire
Railway stations in Great Britain opened in 1864
Railway stations in Great Britain closed in 1953
Former London and North Western Railway stations